Micrommia is a genus of moths in the subfamily Arctiinae. It contains the single species Micrommia jugifera, which is found in the Amazon region.

References

Natural History Museum Lepidoptera generic names catalog

Lithosiini